

Student Organizations at the University of Montana

Academic and Honors

Alpha Lambda Delta
American Humanics Student Association 
American Indian Business Leaders - Support and promote the education and development of future American Indian business leaders.
Anthropology Student Association (Montana) - Further knowledge of field through travel assistance, scholarships and educational trips.
Athletic Training Students’ Association (UM) - Prepare students for careers, as allied health care professionals, provide opportunities for professional development and mentor pre-AT students.
Beta Alpha Psi - Professional and personal development within the fields of accounting, finance, and information systems.
Beta Phi Alpha - Provide professional development activities/opportunities and promote interest in business education.
Delta Rho Tau - Organize fundraising opportunities for students attending national physical therapy meetings.
Finance Club - Provide members with an opportunity to learn more about finance and financial careers through networking events and guest speakers.
Geography Club - Encouraging exploration and research in the field of geography.
Geology Club -  Introduce students to Geosciences by highlighting local and regional geology, promoting social and professional interactions, and supporting student-led inquiry.
Golden Key International Honour Society - Scholarship, leadership, and service organization.
Graduate Student Association - Facilitate interdisciplinary interaction among graduate students and act as a conduit for information to improve the quality of education and enhance the quality of life for graduate students.
Honors Students’ Association - Encourage fellowship among students to promote a standard of excellence in all areas of student life.
Linguistics Club -  Provide an organization where students with a common interest in linguistics may discuss issues, topics, and professional goals/opportunities related to linguistics.
Model Arab League - Learn about Arab culture and history, as well as model the Arab League of Nations to learn about its inner workings and political realities.
Model United Nations (Montana) - Teach students about the UN, diplomacy, parliamentary procedure, and international relations through simulation.
Mortar Board - A national honor society recognizing college seniors for their exemplary scholarship, leadership, service, and distinguished academic achievement.
Petroleum Geologists - Facilitating student relations, understanding, and career-options with oil and gas industry; fostering knowledge of all geological aspects (including environmental issues of oil and gas exploration and productions).
Pi Sigma Alpha Epsilon Mu - To recognize academic achievement and, with the Political Science department, promote extracurricular activities related to public policy.

Environmental Interest
Air and Waste Management Association -  Offers students an opportunity to attend environmental seminars, participate in conferences, and network with the environmental field.
American Fisheries Society - Increase fisheries involvement, interest, and understanding.
Climate Action Now (UM CAN!) 
Forestry Students Association -  Individual and team competition in parliamentary debate at a national level.
Forum for Living with Appropriate Technology (UM FLAT) - Demonstrate sustainable living practices.
Garden Club - Assist students at The University of Montana and College of Technology in their diverse interests in gardening.
Society and Conservation Grad Students - Represent the graduate students in the Society and Conservation department for Forestry and offer social, networking, volunteer, and professional development opportunities for members.
Society for Ecological Restoration - Connect students and faculty involved and interested in ecological restoration.
Society of American Foresters - Student members of SAF gather to share ideas and further our knowledge of the scientific properties of forestry.
Students for Real Food
Wildlife Society (Student Chapter) - To learn about wildlife and management practices while making connections for a professional career.

Language and Culture
African Student Association - Provide a support network for African students, promote awareness, and build a bridge with the community.
Black Student Union - Provide services and programs that address the needs and concerns of all students of African and African-American descent.
Central Asian Association
China Chat Party - Establish a connection between students studying Chinese language and culture with students from Chinese speaking countries who seek to share cross-cultural knowledge and language information.
Chinese Students and Scholars Association - Organize Chinese students and scholars to socialize and help them emerge into the Missoula local community.
European Student Group - To represent European students at The university.
German Club - Promote and experience German culture on campus.
International Food and Culture Festival 
International Student Association
Italian Club - Provide students and interested community members a forum to speak Italian socially, and explore Italian culture.
Japanese Student Association -  Strives to promote positive cultural exchange between Japan, The University of Montana, and surrounding communities.
Kyi-Yo Native American Student Association 
LISTEN - To facilitate dialogue between students and raise awareness of Native American issues.
Le Cercle Francophone (French Club) - Educate and provide exposure to the culture of the French-speaking world to students.
Mount Of Olives
Persian Student Association - Bring Persian speaking students together and represent/share Persian culture with UM campus.
Russian Club -  Promote and enhance exposure to Russian language and culture at The University of Montana.
Saudi Student Association
South & Southeast Asian Cultural Organization - Celebrating religious and cultural events along with discussion about the problems or issues of Southeast Asian students at UM.
Taiwanese Student Association - To welcome incoming Taiwanese students and to educate the community and UM campus.
Wa Ya Wa American Indian Education Student Association - Bring awareness of American Indian education issues and concerns; promote education opportunities and share knowledge.

Music
Chamber Chorale - Music ensemble that performs for the public.
Clarinet Choir (The University Of Montana) - Meet other teachers, professors, performers, and students that share the same aspect of clarinet teaching, playing, and performing.
Collegiate Music Educators’ National Conference (CMENC)
Composers’ Club (UM) - Raise funds for the Composers Showcase each spring and for other events which further the opportunities for and education of its members.
Flute Choir (The University of Montana) - Performs music.
Jazz Band (University)-  Education of students in jazz studies through performance.
Keyboard Society 
Opera Theatre - Develop dramatic and musical operatic skills through the preparation and performance of opera scenes.
Percussion Club (UM) - Educate and perform lab ensemble for percussionists.
Symphonic Wind Ensemble (UM) - Provide musical enrichment for its members as well as the citizens of Montana.
Symphony Orchestra - Teach and apply skills for orchestral involvement by providing students with the opportunity to learn and perform symphonic repertoire.
University Choir - Music ensemble that performs for the public.
Vocal Practicum (UM)- To learn and gain skills in vocal performance by performing in front of voice faculty and guest artists.

Service
Advocates (UM) -  Provide leadership opportunities for members, assist Admissions/New Student Services in recruitment efforts on and off campus, promote UM, and assist campus organizations and departments.
Circle K International - Provide students with the opportunity to volunteer on campus and throughout the community while also engaging with other students.
Colleges Against Cancer - Support initiation of American Cancer Society programs and hold Campus Relay for Life.
Druids - An honor society with the College of Forestry and Conservation that provides services to the college and the surrounding community.
Exercise Science Student Association
Griz for UNICEF - Engage in community service that benefits children.
Peer Advising - Advise, refer, retain students.
Peers Reaching Out (PROS) - To create, present, and facilitate health programs, and provide health resources at campus events.
Rotary Club at The University of Montana - A community service organization that works on several local, national, and international service-oriented projects.
Volunteers in Action - Engage students in their community through volunteering.

Special Interest
Anime Club - Watch Anime in a friendly and relaxed environment.
Artists’ Collective - Peer-promoting student organization whose focus is to sponsor events for art students,  showcase their work, and inspire interest in the arts within the Missoula community.
Backcountry Club, UM - Promote backcountry skiing and snowboarding by UM students via activities, networking, and events.
Big Sky Student Speech Language Hearing Association (BSSSLHA) - Promote Speech Language Pathologist (SLP) benefits within Montana and support SLP student academics.
Business Careers in Entertainment (BCEC) - Provide hands-on experience for students in the entertainment industry.
Camas
Campus Sangha - To introduce and practice the basic concepts of meditation.
Classics Club - Gather and participate in activities of interest to Classics students, such as those related to Greek, Latin, Mythology, etc.
Corps of Cadets - Provide students with the tools, training, and experiences to become officers in the U.S. Army.
Criminology Club (UM) - Inform and educate interested students regarding opportunities in the field of criminology.
Cutbank - National journal of fiction, poetry, and nonfiction.
Djebe Bara Drum and Dance - Research, practice, and preservation of traditional African drum, dance, and song.
Emerging Ceramics Association (UM) - Expand student involvement and awareness in Missoula, and to give students more opportunities to be involved in the ceramic community.
Environmental Law Group - Raise environmental consciousness within the legal community.
Forensics Team (UM) - Individual and team competition in parliamentary debate at a national level.
GenOne (College Church)
Global Grizzlies - Provide humanitarian aid in third world countries every summer.
Good Health Whole Food Group - To educate, discuss, and promote the benefits of plant-based diet, and to look at our food on a holistic level; to come to understand our food's impact in areas of health, ethics and the environment.
Hang Gliding & Paragliding Club (Missoula) - Facilitate safe foot-launched soaring flights from Mount Sentinel.
Indigenous Filmmakers Club - Student network for filmmakers to work on and share film projects, and organize screenings for public viewing.
Interfraternity Council (IFC) - Oversees, organizes, and encourages the fraternities on campus.
International Food and Culture Festival
Missoula Folklore Society (Student Chapter) -  Sharing, promoting, preserving, and enjoying the music, dance, arts, crafts, and skills of traditional and contemporary cultures.
Magic Club 
Marketing Club - To provide students with hands on marketing experience. To prepare students entering the job market in the area of marketing.
Missoula Film Society - Host film screenings and bring in film-related guest speakers for all UM students and the greater Missoula community. Facilitate greater communication between The university and greater Missoula film communities.
Montana Equality Now (UM)
Neuro Networking Club - A social club for adults with Aspergers/Autism and friends.
On The Two 
Oval Magazine (The) - Undergraduate literary magazine with artwork, short stories, and poetry written and created by students.
Panhellenic Council - Helps to govern and assist all of the sororities on the campus and works with the IFC to plan all Greek activities.
Random Activity Club - Engage group members in a wide variety of sports and activities.
Role-Players Club Missoula 
Society for Creative Anachronism - Educational group seeking to learn by re-creating the Middle Ages through living history.
Society for Ecological Restoration - Connect students and faculty interested in ecological restoration.
Student Advocates for Healthy Living
Student Recreation Association -  Provide educational activities, community service, fundraisers, and social extracurricular activities for all UM students.
Student Sculpture Association (SSA) - Provide sculpture-based art students an opportunity to expand their working knowledge of materials and techniques.
Student Dance Club - To support and enhance the dance experience of university students, as well as to promote dance on campus and the community.
Students For Peace and Justice - Inform the public about current issues and provide a supportive forum for students who are interested in peace and justice issues.
Theater Collective - To enhance the theatre community on the campus and create a venue to perform as a group.
Tour of the Swan River Valley Bike Club - Provide training and community for those interested in TOSRV in May
University Crafters 
Wildlife Society (Student Chapter) - To learn about wildlife and management practices while making connections for a professional career.

Sports
Alpine Ski Club - Provide and teach competitive alpine ski racing at the UM.
Baseball Club - UM Club Baseball is a competitive baseball team that competes in the Northern Pacific Conference sanctioned by the NCBA.
Climbing Club
Club Ultimate-River Rats - Play the sport of ultimate Frisbee at a competitive, but fun, level.
Club Ultimate-Women's - Promote and play Women's Ultimate at the college level.
Cycling (UM) - Promote and engage in bicycle riding and racing.
Equestrian Team (UM )- Provide opportunity to college students of any ability to learn to ride, care for horses, and compete.
Fencing Club (U of M) - Teach, practice and promote sport of fencing
Hockey (UM Men) - Hockey competition with other collegiate teams.
Hockey (UM Women) - Allow female university students to participate in hockey at a competitive (but club) level.
Lacrosse Club (Men's)- To win a national championship, again, and have fun.
Nordic Ski Club (UM) - To give students the opportunity to cross country ski.
Rowing Club 
Rugby (Men's UM Jesters) - Teach students the fundamentals of rugby and play in league matches.
Rugby (Women's Betterside) -  Represent and perform for the U of M in rugby matches and tournaments across the region.
Taekwondo Club (UM) - To teach Taekwondo to students and locals; build kicking, punching, and self-defense skills.
Triathlon Club (U of M) -  Promote the sport of triathlon and provide a forum for student athletes to train and compete in regional and national events.
Water Polo - To learn, practice, and play waterpolo.
Whitewater Club (UM)
Woodsman Team (UM) - Compete in collegiate timber sports competitions and learn about traditional and modern professional forestry.

Support
Active Minds 
Alliance For Disability And Students At UM (ADSUM) - Advocate for equal access, civil rights and employment
Lambda Alliance -  Increase visibility and acceptance of the LGBTQIA community on campus as well as provide support and education for that community and its Allies.
Women's Resource Center - Provide educational information and awareness of women's issues as well as LGBTQQI issues.

Spirituality and Faith
Baptist Collegiate Ministries - Provide a ministry and service to UM students by leading them toward faith in God through Jesus Christ.
Buddhist Club - To introduce Buddhism to new student members and continue with on-going members.
Cru - Interdenominational Christian group offering a place for students to explore and grow in the Christian faith.
Catholic Campus Ministry (Christ the King) -  To provide activities and support to Catholic students at UM.
Chi Alpha Campus Ministries - To promote, encourage, and facilitate interpersonal relations among Christian and seeking students.
Emmaus Campus Ministry 
Hillel: The Foundation for Jewish Campus Life 
InterVarsity Christian Fellowship 
LDSSA (Latter Day Saint Student Association) - Help all LDS university students stay closely affiliated with the Church, succeed in their studies and achieve a balanced life; encourage LDS students to remain/become influences for good and provide activities consistent with LDS standards.
Muslim Students' Association - Raise awareness of Islam and Islamic culture.
SOZO

Health Professions Organizations
American Pharmacist Association - Participate in regional and national meetings as well as patient care project.
Physical Therapy Student Association - Promote profession and improve student health knowledge.
Pre-Medical Student Association - Support for pre-medical students seeking careers in medicine.
Pre-Veterinary Sciences Club - Inform and disseminate information about career options in the field.
Psychology Club - Gather psychology students for discussion about the field and to become acquainted with each other.
Psychology Graduate Student Association - Provide training and research opportunities for professional development.
Psychology (School) Student Organization - Increase communication among school psychologists at UM and reach out to the Missoula community through community involvement.
University of Montana Athletic Training Student Association (UMATSA) - Promote profession and attend the regional meeting.

Politics and Activism
College Democrats - Educate and inform students about Democratic values and candidates.
College Republicans - Promote conservative principles and elect Republican candidates.
Conservation Voters (MT) - To activate students in political organizing and action to help elect pro-conservation candidates to all levels of government.
Organizing for America - Provide UM students with the opportunity to have an effect on legislation being passed in congress.
Planned Parenthood Leaders and Advocates - Inform students and community members of issues facing women's reproductive rights by specifically focusing on PPMT and the services it provides the community and the larger political issues it faces.
Students for Choice - Educate students about reproductive issues and protect reproductive rights.
Students For Economic And Social Justice - Raise awareness of, and take action on social justice causes on college campus, in the community, and abroad.
Students for MontPIRG - To reestablish a student funded MontPIRG.
Students for Peace and Justice - Inform the public about current issues and provide a supportive forum for students who are interested in peace and justice issues.

Law School Organizations
American Association for Justice (UM Chapter) -  Promote education and the practice of legal justice in an effort to make the trial by jury system more accessible to all Americans.
Environmental Law Group - Raise environmental consciousness within the legal community.
Native American Law Student Association - An educational law student association that strives to promote unity and cooperation, advance Indian people, foster  communication between Indian and non-Indian law students, general public, Indian people, lawyers and Indian lawyers.
Rural Advocacy League - To increase awareness of rural issues and improve communication between rural citizens and public policy makers.
Women's Law Caucus - Promote women's issues in the law and interact with members of the Bar through mentorship and community volunteering.

References

External links
University of Montana
Student Involvement Guide

Student life at the University of Montana